This is a list of Greenville Triumph SC head coaches since the 2019 season. The club has had one head coach, John Harkes.

List of head coaches
This list includes all those who have managed the club since 2019.

References

External links 
 Greenville Triumph SC

 
Greenville Triumph SC